Wales Peak is located on the border of Alberta and British Columbia. It was named in 1927 by Alfred J. Ostheimer after the British astronomer William Wales who sailed on Captain Cook's second voyage of discovery.

See also
 List of peaks on the British Columbia–Alberta border

References

Three-thousanders of Alberta
Three-thousanders of British Columbia
Canadian Rockies